Herbert George Chapman (1 December 1891 – 4 February 1970) was an Australian rules footballer who played for the St Kilda Football Club in the Victorian Football League (VFL).

Notes

External links 

1891 births
1970 deaths
Australian rules footballers from New South Wales
St Kilda Football Club players
Paddington Australian Football Club players